Down with the Scene is the second studio album by American electronic music artist Kid606. It was released on compact disc on June 20, 2000 as his first full-length album for Ipecac Recordings.

Reception

From contemporary reviews, John Bush of AllMusic noted that Kid606 "injects a much-needed sense of humor into the experimental/hardcore scene" which "may not be enough to warrant any more than two or three listens, but there's at least a 50–50 balance between senseless distortion and well-programmed tracks with a semblance of a groove."

In The New Rolling Stone Album Guide, critic Jon Caramanica referred to Down with the Scene as being "as ironic an electronic album as there is." Pitchfork placed the album at number 49 on its list of "The 50 Best IDM Albums of All Time", with Ned Raggett opining that Kid606 "helped upend IDM’s stereotype of bloodless astringency" and that the album was "a kaleidoscopic effort and a half. There's smooth swagger on “GQ on the EQ” and gentle sweetness with “For When Yr Just Happy to Be Alive” slamming up against frenetic compositions like “Punkshit” and “Two Fingers in the Air Anarchy Style.”"

Track listing

Personnel 
Cex – sampling
Steve Ferrari – sampling
George Horn – mastering
Hrvåtski – remixing
Seldon Hunt – cover art
Kid606 – production
Mike Patton – vocals on "Secrets 4 Sale"
Kevin Martin – saxophone
WWJD Orchestra – sounds

References

Footnotes

Sources

 

2000 albums
Ipecac Recordings albums
Kid606 albums